Snježana Pejčić (born 13 July 1982) is a Croatian athlete who competes in shooting. Her first notable success was winning silver at the Juniors European Shooting Championship in Thessaloniki in 2002, and she won second place at an ISSF World Cup held in Munich in 2008. She took up sports shooting at the age of 15 and she is a member of Lokomotiva sport shooting club in Rijeka. Her greatest success came at the 2008 Summer Olympics where she earned a bronze medal.

World records

* unrecognized as WR due to insufficient number of countries entered

References

External links

1982 births
Living people
Croatian female sport shooters
ISSF rifle shooters
Olympic shooters of Croatia
Shooters at the 2008 Summer Olympics
Shooters at the 2012 Summer Olympics
Shooters at the 2016 Summer Olympics
Shooters at the 2020 Summer Olympics
Olympic bronze medalists for Croatia
Sportspeople from Rijeka
Olympic medalists in shooting
Medalists at the 2008 Summer Olympics
European Games competitors for Croatia
Shooters at the 2015 European Games
Mediterranean Games gold medalists for Croatia
Competitors at the 2009 Mediterranean Games
Mediterranean Games medalists in shooting
Shooters at the 2019 European Games